Rosalie (Ros) Edith Bandt (born 18 August 1951 in Geelong) is an Australian composer, sound artist, academic and performer.

Biography

Bandt was born in Geelong, Victoria. Her father Lewis Bandt was a car designer and notable for designing the first ute.

Described as one of the most individual presences in Australian music, Bandt is an internationally acclaimed sound artist, composer, researcher and performer. Trained as a school teacher, Bandt went on to study chance music and completed her master's degree in 1974 at Monash University with a thesis on the work of John Cage and later completed her PhD in 1983 also at Monash. In 1977 Bandt and Martin Harris created a sound installation, Winds and Circuits which fed audio into television signals to create electronic visual patterns. Since that time she pioneered interactive sound installations, sound sculptures, and created sound playgrounds, spatial music systems, and some 40 sound installations worldwide.

A pioneer of interactive sound sculpture in Australia, she has exhibited in many Australian city and regional centres, including her work Sound Playground in Brunswick, Melbourne in 1981. Making use of electronics, tapes and interactive playback systems, Bandt's compositions also feature environmental sounds and unusual instrument combinations. Bandt performs on a wide variety of instruments including recorders, psaltry, percussion and the tarhu. She is a founding member of ensembles LIME, Back to Back Zithers, La Romanesca, Carte Blanche and the Free Music Ensemble.

Awards

Don Banks Music Award
The Don Banks Music Award was established in 1984 to publicly honour a senior artist of high distinction who has made an outstanding and sustained contribution to music in Australia. It was founded by the Australia Council in honour of Don Banks, Australian composer, performer and the first chair of its music board.

|-
| 1991
| Ros Bandt
| Don Banks Music Award
| 
|-

Bandt was awarded the Cochrane Smith award for sound heritage in 2012 by the National Film and Sound Archive.

In 2020 Bandt was awarded the Richard Gill Award for Distinguished Services to Australian Music at the APRA Art Music Awards in recognition of her 40-year commitment to inter-disciplinary work.

Discography
 1980 Love lyrics and romances of Renaissance Spain. La Romanesca. Move Records, MD 3034
 1981 Improvisations in Acoustic Chambers Tank Pieces and Silo Pieces  Move records MS  3035, MC 3035
 1982 Soft and Fragile: Music in Glass and Clay  Move Records MS 3045, MC 3045
 1985 Clay Music. LIME. Move Records, MD 3065
 1989 Stargazer Move Records MD 3075, MC 3075
 1992 An Iberian Triangle: Music of Christian, Jewish and Moorish Spain before 1492. La Romanesca. Move Records MD 3114
 1992 Quivering String. Back to Back Zithers. Move Records, MD 3141
 1993 Footsteps  Move  Records, MD 3135
 1995 Glass & Clay Move Records, MD 3045
 1999 Via Frescobaldi. La Romaesca. Move Records, MD 3206
 2001 Stack Move Records, MD 3145
 2003 Sonic Archaeologies Move Records, MD 3155
 2005 Monodies. La Romanesca. Move Records, MD 3044
 2008 Isobue, Japanese Sea Whistle Sonic Art Gallery SG0801
 2013 Jaara Jaara Seasons Hearing Places
 2015 Bird Song - Trio Avium Hearing Places
 2016 Tarhu connections Hearing Places

Selected publications 

 2001 Sound Sculpture, Intersections in Sound and Sculpture in Australian Artworks
 2007 Hearing Places: Interdisciplinary Writings on Sound, Place, Time and Culture with  Michelle Duffy and Dolly MacKinnon

References

External links
Ros Bandt website
Australian Sound Design Project

1951 births
Living people
Australian composers
20th-century women musicians
21st-century women musicians
20th-century Australian musicians
21st-century Australian musicians
Australian women composers